German Karachevsky (born 17 July 1968) is a Russian cross-country skier. He competed in the men's 10 kilometre classical event at the 1992 Winter Olympics.

References

1968 births
Living people
Russian male cross-country skiers
Olympic cross-country skiers of the Unified Team
Cross-country skiers at the 1992 Winter Olympics
Place of birth missing (living people)